Overschie is a neighborhood of Rotterdam, Netherlands, formerly a separate village with its own municipality.

The village of Overschie was located on the intersection of four rivers called "Schie": the Delftsche Schie, Schiedamsche Schie, Delfshavensche Schie, and Rotterdamsche Schie. It was a separate municipality between 1817 and 1941, when it merged with Rotterdam. Immediately after the Second World War, the construction of a large suburb was begun southeast of the village.

"Overschie" is now also the name of a deelgemeente (borough) of the city of Rotterdam, covering the former village, the neighborhood Overschie, Zestienhoven (which also holds the Rotterdam The Hague Airport), and the countryside to the north including the hamlet Zweth.

References

Former municipalities of South Holland
Boroughs of Rotterdam
Neighbourhoods of Rotterdam